Swanage Grammar School was a former school in Swanage, Dorset, England, established in . The building is defunct (from 2002) having been used as a centre for outdoor pursuits and geography-based learning. Robert Rochelle managed the centre for the final 16 years. The building is at the northern end of Swanage, at the top of Northbrook Road, 15 minutes walk from the sea.

Notable former pupils

 Peter Cockroft, BBC weather presenter
 Peter Foote, Professor of Scandinavian Studies from 1963–83 at University College London
 David Mellor, Conservative MP for Putney from 1979–97

References

Defunct schools in Dorset
Defunct grammar schools in England
Educational institutions established in 1929
Educational institutions disestablished in 1974
Swanage
1929 establishments in England
1974 disestablishments in England